George Brooks (2 January 1892–1979) was an English footballer who played in the Football League for Bury.

References

1892 births
1966 deaths
English footballers
Association football midfielders
English Football League players
Bury F.C. players